Grand Union: Stories is a 2019 short story collection by Zadie Smith. It was published on 3 October 2019 by Hamish Hamilton, an imprint of Penguin Books.

Contents
Grand Union contains nineteen short stories. Eleven of the stories are new and unpublished and eight were originally published in The New Yorker, The Paris Review, or Granta.

Reception
Publishers Weekly called the collection "smart and bewitching" and said, "Smith exercises her range without losing her wry, slightly cynical humor. Readers of all tastes will find something memorable in this collection."

Kirkus Reviews said, "Several of Smith's stories are on their ways to becoming classics."

David L. Ulin of the Los Angeles Times wrote that "Smith is at her finest" in Grand Union and praised the collection's "balance between humor and self-laceration."

Writing for Literary Hub, author John Freeman called Smith "one of our finest short story writers" and said, "The compression and swiftness of these tales are opposite skills to the ones Smith has plied in her five, wondrously different novels. Yet to watch these tales unfold is to feel a gladness that only virtuosity—and emotional depth—can ignite."

Alice O'Keeffe, writing for The Bookseller, said, "The first ever collection of short stories from the wonderful Zadie Smith is surely a must-read for her many fans."

Writing for The New York Times Book Review, author Rebecca Makkai wrote, "While the collection might not coalesce as a unit, it contains some of Smith's most vibrant, original fiction, the kind of writing she'll surely be known for."

References

External links

 

2019 short story collections
Short story collections by Zadie Smith
Hamish Hamilton books
British short story collections